Sill Tenant House is a historic home located at Jerusalem in Yates County, New York. It is a structure built about 1870.

It was listed on the National Register of Historic Places in 1994.

References

Houses on the National Register of Historic Places in New York (state)
Houses completed in 1870
Houses in Yates County, New York
National Register of Historic Places in Yates County, New York